Space City or space city may refer to:
 Space City (newspaper), an underground newspaper published in Houston from 1969 to 1972
 Space City USA, a planned theme park near Huntsville, Alabama
 Houston, Texas or Space City
 Titusville, Florida or Space City
 Leicester, UK or Space City
 Space habitat, a space station intended to provide a permanent home for a large population

See also 
 Space City Kicks
 Space City Sigma
 1971 Space City 300